Anton Ström (30 July 1910 – 17 December 1994) was a Swedish sailor. He competed in the O-Jolle event at the 1936 Summer Olympics.

References

External links
 

1910 births
1994 deaths
Swedish male sailors (sport)
Olympic sailors of Sweden
Sailors at the 1936 Summer Olympics – O-Jolle
Sportspeople from Stockholm